Since the 2018 Brazilian general election, polling companies have published surveys tracking voting intention for the next election. The results of these surveys are listed below in reverse chronological order and include candidates who frequently polled above 3%.

The first round of the 2022 Brazilian general election took place on 2 October. As no candidate reached a majority of the votes, a second round was held on 30 October.

First round
The first round took place on 2 October 2022.

Chart

Polling aggregation

2022

Jul–Oct

Apr–Jun

Jan–Mar

2021

2020

2019

Second round 
The second round took place on 30 October 2022.

Bolsonaro vs. Lula

Polling aggregation

After 2 October 2022

2021 to 2 October 2022 
Pages using left with no arguments

Other

2021

2020

2019

See also
President of Brazil
Opinion polling for the 2018 Brazilian general election
Opinion polling on the Jair Bolsonaro presidency

Notes

References

2022 in Brazilian politics
Opinion polling in Brazil